Marc Macaulay (born October 13, 1957) is an American actor.

Early life and career
He was born and raised in Millinocket, Maine. He graduated with a BFA in theater. He appeared in the USA Network Series Burn Notice for five episodes as Agent Harris, and as "Blaine Bauer" in the horror film Thirteen Floors.
Some of his most prominent film roles have included Monster, Premonition, Palmetto, Passenger 57, and The Hawk is Dying. In television, he has had guest appearances on Miami Vice, seaQuest DSV, and he played the role of Agent Ives on the television series Prison Break. He also appeared in the episode of Robert Dirscherl in Unsolved Mysteries playing an agent.

Selected filmography

1985-1989: Miami Vice (TV Series) as Brookings
1988: Grave Robbers as Salesman
1989-1991: The Adventures of Superboy (TV Series)
1989: No Retreat, No Surrender 3: Blood Brothers as Terrorist
1990: Cop Target
1990: Edward Scissorhands as Reporter #1
1992: Dead Boyz Can't Fly as O'Brien
1992: Passenger 57 as Vincent
1993: Matinee as Shopping Cart Crook
1993: Cop and a Half as Waldo
1993: The Real McCoy as Karl
1993: Hidden Fears as Marty Vanbeeber
1994: China Moon as CSU Technician
1994: Tollbooth as Cop #2
1994-1995: Matlock (TV Series) as Detective Bob Garrison
1994-1995: seaQuest DSV (TV Series) as Colonel Manheim
1995: Bad Boys as Noah Trafficante
1995: The Perez Family as Male volunteer
1995: Fair Game as Navigator
1995: Point of Betrayal as Ted's Attorney
1995: Smoke n Lightnin as Jones
1996: Up Close & Personal as Police Spokesman
1996: Shootfighter II as Malo
1996: Blood and Wine as Guard
1997: Rosewood as Bobby
1997: Contact as NASA Technician
1997: Catherine's Grove as William Mason
1998: Great Expectations as Cop on Boat
1998: Palmetto as Miles Meadows
1998: Wild Things as Walter
1998: The Truman Show as Citizen Searching Truman (uncredited)
1998: Holy Man as Cameraman - Brutus
1999: Instinct as Foley
2000: The Crew as Driver
2000: Tigerland as Tigerland CO
2002:  as Airport Officer Arch Ridley
2002: Big Trouble as Airport Officer Arch Ridley
2002: The Code Conspiracy as Commander
2002: Bending All the Rules as Sargeant
2003: 2 Fast 2 Furious as Agent #1
2003: From Justin to Kelly as Mr. O'Mara
2003: Monster Will / Daddy 'John'
2004: Wild Things 2 as Jayson
2004: The Punisher as Dante
2005: Red Eye as Coast Guard Officer
2005: Transporter 2 as U.S. Marshal Brown
2005: Natale a Miami as Cop #1
2005: Planet Ibsen as Dr. Rank
2006: Descansos as Attendent
2006: The Hawk Is Dying as Alonzo
2006: Hoot as Drill Sergeant
2006: Lonely Hearts as Warden Broady
2006: Miami Vice as Air Traffic Supervisor
2006: Prison Break (TV Series) as Agent Ives
2006: South Beach Dreams as Mr. Ellison
2007: Walking Tall: The Payback as Herb Sherman
2007: Premonition as Sheriff Reilly
2007: Cleaner as Vic
2007: Matrimonio alle Bahamas as Senator Jones
2007: Naked Under Heaven as Bennett
2007: Thirteen Floors as Blaine Bauer
2007: Burn Notice (TV Series) as Agent Harris
2008: Mad Money as Agent Wayne
2008: The Mysteries of Pittsburgh as Lenny Burns
2008: Recount (TV Movie) as Bob Zoellick
2008: Feast II: Sloppy Seconds as The Sheriff
2008: Marley & Me as The Police Officer (uncredited)
2008: My Life: Untitled as Jenna's Father
2009: My Bloody Valentine 3D as Riggs
2009: I Love You Phillip Morris as Houston Cop
2009: Recession Proof as Max Murphy
2009: Nine Dead as Father Francis
2010: Father of Invention as Grocery Store Clerk
2010: Wild Things: Foursome as Captain Blanchard
2010: Conviction as Officer Boisseau
2010: The Jack of Spades as Old Dymond
2010: Red as Forensics Investigator
2010: Stanley DeBrock as Jake
2011: Seconds Apart as Father Zinselmeyer
2011: Drive Angry as State Police Sergeant
2011: Son of Morning as Philip's Father
2011: Killer Joe as 'Digger' Soames
2011: Dolphin Tale as John Fitch
2011: Winter as Board Member Fitch
2012: Step Up Revolution as Uniformed Cop
2012: Death from Above as Oclar
2012: Company M: A Mob of Soldiers as Mr. Smith
2013: Broken Blood as Jake 
2013: Pawn Shop Chronicles as Cook 
2013: 12 Years a Slave as Captain 
2013: Assumed Killer as Chief Grimaldi 
2014: House of Bodies as Corrections Officer 
2015: All Saints Eve as Preacher William 
2015: Careful What You Wish For as Gordon  
2017: Manhattan Cop'' as Peter Spriggs

References

External links

1957 births
Male actors from Maine
American male film actors
American male television actors
Living people
People from Millinocket, Maine